Alexandru Nazare (born 25 June 1980, Oneşti, Romania) is a Romanian politician, Minister of Finance of Romania between December 2020 and July 2021, senator elected in the 2020 parliamentary elections and the special representative of the Romanian Government for Romania's candidacy for hosting the European Cybersecurity Competence Centre, 2020. Previously in 2012, he held the position of Minister of Transport and Infrastructure and in December 2008, he became the youngest representative of Romania in the European Parliament.

Biography 
Alexandru Nazare was born on June 25, 1980, in Onești, Bacău County, Romania, into a family of teachers, his mother being a German teacher and his father, a sports teacher.

In 2001, he began studying political science at the National School of Political and Administrative Studies in Bucharest. Between 2002 and 2004, he continued with a study program in Berlin, at the Bard College Berlin, where he deepens his knowledge in International Relations, European Affairs, Political Theory and Neoconservatism. Later, between 2015 and 2017, Nazare is pursuing a MPA Hertie School (HSG) in Berlin.

Background and government career 
After completing his studies, Alexandru Nazare began his political career at the Ministry of European Integration, as minister advisor, to Anca Boagiu, in the period preceding Romania's accession to the European Union.

In 2007, Nazare became an adviser to the Group of the European People's Party in the European Parliament, one year later, he ran on the PDL lists in the European Parliamentary elections, becoming the youngest Romanian MEP in the EP. From this position, Nazare worked in the Committee on Budgets and in the Committee on Foreign Affairs, where he managed to stand out by submitting several motions for resolutions, including some on the Republic of Moldova, energy strategy projects or Romani people rights.

In 2009, after the end of his term as Member of the European Parliament, Alexandru Nazare was appointed Secretary of State at the Department for European Affairs, having the responsibility of representing Romania in the dialogue with the European institutions.

Starting with April 2010, Alexandru Nazare became Secretary of State in the Ministry of Public Finance, where he coordinated the Certification and Payment Authority, the Phare Payments and Contracting Office, as well as the tax department.

Between November 2010 and February 2012, he was appointed Secretary of State in the Ministry of Transport and Infrastructure, he had coordinating the institutions and structures in the field of civil aviation, subordinated to the Ministry. Also in this term, Nazare played an important role in mediating discussions between the ministry and international financial institutions, being the chief negotiator for joint evaluation missions with international financial institutions and monitoring of externally funded projects.

Minister of Transport and Infrastructure 

During his term to the Ministry of Transport and Infrastructure, Nazare obtained approval from the European Commission to finance projects to rehabilitate the railway system worth 800 million euros and tendered sections of motorway financed with European funds, worth 850 million. As a minister, he tendered for the restoration of feasibility studies for the Sibiu-Pitești and Comarnic - Brașov highways, the first to be financed from European funds and the second through public-private partnership. However, the auctions were canceled by the new government, in the autumn of 2012.

In 2012, Alexandru Nazare was elected deputy on the lists of the Democratic Liberal Party, for 4 years, during which time he was noted for his work in several parliamentary committees, including the Committee on Economic Policy, Reform and Privatization, the Committee on European Affairs, Committee on Transport and Infrastructure.

2016 local elections 

In the last year of his parliamentary term, Alexandru Nazare decided to run for Sector 1 City Hall, being supported by the National Liberal Party in the May 2016 local elections. Nazare proposes a new vision for Sector 1 with a program based on a series of strategic urban development and traffic reduction projects. The objectives proposed by him will remain the same priority 4 years later, after the 2016-2020 mandate was won by the candidate supported by PSD at the City Hall of Sector 1.

In November, he became an adviser to the Minister at the Ministry of Transport, Infrastructure and Communications, where Nazare supports the ministry's efforts in carrying out several infrastructure projects.

Minister of Finance 
On the Romanian parliamentary elections in December 2020, Alexandru Nazare was re-elected as a member of the Romanian Parliament and he won a senator's mandate.

At the end of 2020, Alexandru Nazare is invested with the position of Minister of Finance in the Cîțu Cabinet. He begins this term by outlining an economic program formulated according to the relaunch principle, based on a series of liberal economic policies and a prudent fiscal-budgetary attitude. Despite the recession generated by the context of the COVID-19 pandemic, Nazare manages to develop a budget formula in order to lead the Romanian economy towards a path of sustainable fiscal adjustment.

The new minister starts in full force the activity within the Ministry of Finance, by ordering some internal controls, at the headquarters of ANAF Bucharest, after the institution sent summonses to the taxpayers for amounts already paid. Nazare's agenda in the Ministry of Finance focuses on economic recovery, reform and integration, with special attention being paid to projects to digitize the Romanian tax administration.

On 8 July 2021, Nazare was ousted from the position of Minister of Public Finance, and his predecessor, then-incumbent Prime Minister Florin Cîțu became acting minister.

Projects and initiatives 
In 2020, Nazare achieves a performance for Romania as the special representative of the Romanian Government for Romania's candidacy for hosting the European Cybersecurity Competence Centre. The Romanian team, led by Alexandru Nazare, won the competition with the other 6 states that submitted their candidacy to host the Cyber Security Center, the only European agency in charge of managing the European Union's investments in the field of cyber security.

References

External links
 
 https://mfinante.gov.ro/ro/despre-minister/conducere
 https://mfinante.gov.ro/documents/35673/371385/cvAlexandruNazare.pdf/
 https://gov.ro/ro/guvernul/cabinetul-de-ministri/ministrul-finantelor
 https://www.facebook.com/AlexandruNazareBucuresti/

1980 births
People from Onești
National Liberal Party (Romania) politicians
Democratic Liberal Party (Romania) politicians
Hertie School alumni
Living people
Romanian Ministers of Finance
MEPs for Romania 2007–2009